Ruth Island (also known as Ruth Cay) is an artificial island off the southern coast of Saint Croix, U.S. Virgin Islands near Port Alucroix.  It was created in the mid-1960s from the dredging of Krauses Lagune and is about 40 acres (16 ha).

Because the island is free of small Indian mongooses (Urva auropunctata) biologists introduced the endangered Saint Croix ground lizard (Pholidoscelis polops) from the Protestant Cay population.  Today there are about 30 ground lizards on Ruth Island.

References

Artificial islands of the United States
Islands of the United States Virgin Islands
Uninhabited islands of the United States Virgin Islands
1960s establishments in the United States Virgin Islands